For the long track speed skating events, see Speed skating at the 2002 Winter Olympics

Short track speed skating at the 2002 Winter Olympics was held from 13 to 23 February. Eight events were contested at Salt Lake Ice Center (normally called Delta Center (now Vivint Arena)). Two new events were added for these games, with the men's and women's 1500 metres making debuts.

Medal summary

Medal table

China led the medal table with seven, while Evgenia Radanova's two medals for Bulgaria were their first in the sport.

Men's events

Women's events

Records
Two world records and fifteen Olympic records were set in Salt Lake City.

Participating NOCs
Twenty-six nations competed in the short track events at Salt Lake City. Belarus, the Czech Republic, Hong Kong, Israel, Romania and Slovakia made their short track debuts.

References

 
2002 Winter Olympics events
2002
2002 in short track speed skating